Pakistan national amateur Greco-Roman wrestling athletes represents Pakistan in regional, continental, and world tournaments and matches sanctioned by the United World Wrestling (UWW).

Olympics

World Championships

Asian Games

Asian Championships

References
 FILA Wrestling Database
 FILA

Wrestling in Pakistan
Wrestling